Colobosaura kraepelini, the Chaco colobosaura, is a species of lizard in the family Gymnophthalmidae. It is endemic to Paraguay.

References

Colobosaura
Reptiles of Paraguay
Endemic fauna of Paraguay
Reptiles described in 1910
Taxa named by Franz Werner